Shri Rama Raksha Stotram (Sanskrit: श्रीरामरक्षास्तोत्रम्) is a Sanskrit stotra, hymn of praise dedicated to Rama, used as a prayer for protection. The composer of the Rama Raksha Stotra was Budha Kaushika, which is said to be another name of Brahmarshi Vishvamitra.

Text

References 

Hindu devotional texts
Sanskrit texts
Vaishnavism